The 'Ain Samiya Goblet is a silver cup from the Middle Bronze Age I (2300-2000 BC), found in a tomb at Ain Samiya near modern Ramallah, Palestine. It depicts a double-headed god with an animal body planting crops and the dead body of a serpent, parts of whom are being held by two male figures. The scenes are proported to depict a proto version of the Babylonian creation epic, the Enuma Elish and the defeat of Tiamat by the Babylonian patron deity, Marduk. The goblet demonstrates clear influences from Mesopotamia on Proto-Canaanite culture and shares other parallels with contemporary depictions like the Khafaje plaque during Babylonian captivity.

References 

Archaeology
Babylon
Bronze Age
Biblical archaeology
Mesopotamian mythology
Mesopotamia